Meadfoot Sea Road is a 6.1 hectare geological Site of Special Scientific Interest in Devon, England, notified in 1987 for its Devonian geology.

Sources

 English Nature citation sheet for the site (accessed 6 August 2006)

External links
 English Nature website (SSSI information)

Sites of Special Scientific Interest in Devon
Sites of Special Scientific Interest notified in 1987
Geology of Devon